(French for 'homeless person') may refer to:
 "Sans domicile fixe", a 1990 song by the band Bratsch
 "Sans domicile fixe", a 1996 song by Raphaël Faÿs

French words and phrases